McCredie Township is one of eighteen townships in Callaway County, Missouri, USA.  As of the 2010 census, its population was 760.

History
McCredie Township was created sometime between 1883 and 1897 from what was before then, generally speaking, the southern sector of a much larger historic Liberty Township, with some alterations of adjacent township boundaries.

McCredie was the name of a prominent local family.
The main town, long named McCredie, was fused into the incorporation of the village of Kingdom City in 1970.

Geography

The streams of Allen Branch, Leeper Branch, McKinney Creek, Rocky Branch and Sallees Branch run through this township.

References

 USGS Geographic Names Information System (GNIS)

External links
 US-Counties.com
 City-Data.com

Townships in Callaway County, Missouri
Jefferson City metropolitan area
Townships in Missouri